Winterthur Seen railway station is a railway station that serves Seen, which is district number 3 in Winterthur, a city in the canton of Zurich, Switzerland.  It forms part of the Tösstalbahn section between Winterthur Grüze and Bauma.

Location
Situated at the north eastern edge of central Seen, the station borders the quarter of Sonnenberg, on the other side of the tracks.

History
The station was opened on 4 May 1875, together with the rest of the first section of the Tösstalbahn, between Grüze and Bauma. One year later, the line was extended to Wald.

From 1882, the operating railway company also had a line of its own to Winterthur Hauptbahnhof.

On 10 June 1918, the station and the rest of the line were nationalized, and came under the control of the SBB-CFF-FFS.

Tracks 
Winterthur Seen has two platform tracks.

Services

Zürich S-Bahn 
The station is served by the following Zürich S-Bahn lines:

Local transport
Stadtbus Winterthur serves the station with one Winterthur trolleybus line and one other bus line.  Both lines terminate there.

See also 

History of rail transport in Switzerland
Rail transport in Switzerland

References

External links 

 SBB-CFF-FFS website (Swiss rail operator)

This article is based upon a translation of the German language version as at November 2011.

Railway stations in the canton of Zürich
Swiss Federal Railways stations
Transport in Winterthur
Railway stations in Switzerland opened in 1875